The Grove Ferry Picnic Area is near Upstreet, in Kent, England, on the site of an old hand-drawn ferry that once crossed the River Stour here. The area is maintained and managed by Kent County Council.

It is beside the Grove Ferry Public House, built in 1831 and now managed by Shepherd Neame.

History

The Grove Ferry Public House took its name from a hand drawn ferry that crossed the River Stour in front of the building. The pub was also known as Grove Ferry Inn. A road bridge replaced the old ferry in 1963.

Grove Ferry Boat Club was founded in 1964. The clubhouse, dating from the early seventies, is on the south bank of the river, just below the Grove Ferry Bridge.

Kent County Council renovated the bridge in September 2000.

Location
It is close to the railway level crossing, (the site of a former dismantled railway station). The road leads down from to the crossing and then over the bridge, before heading to Grove Hill or Preston. 
When the level crossing is down, cars are queued back over the bridge.

The picnic site is to the right of the pub car park beside the river.
It is a good starting point for sections of the long-distance walks; Stour Valley Walk, the Saxon Shore Way or the Wantsum Walks (beside the Wantsum Channel), all that lead beside the River Stour.

Fishing rights were granted during the reign of King Henry II and are still available today along the river bank. 
Some of the fishing swims (sections of the river where fish are found) have been adapted for those with disabilities. The Canterbury and District Angling Club hold most fishing rights over the River Stour. Subject to an agreement between the association and English Nature.

It is also adjacent to the Stodmarsh National Nature Reserve. The river is part of an area designated as a Site of Special Scientific Interest (SSSI), recently upgraded to an international Ramsar site.

See also
Grove Ferry and Upstreet railway station

External links
Tonbridge Council Page
Grove Ferry River Trips
Grove Ferry Public house/restaurant
Netmums site
Uk tourist site

References

Country parks in Kent
Picnic